The 2015–16 Nevada Wolf Pack women's basketball team represents the University of Nevada, Reno during the 2015–16 NCAA Division I women's basketball season. The Wolf Pack, led by ninth year head coach Jane Albright, play their home games at the Lawlor Events Center and were members of the Mountain West Conference. They finished the season 5–25, 4–14 in Mountain West play to finish in tenth place. They lost in the first round of the Mountain West women's tournament to Utah State.

Roster

Schedule

|-
!colspan=9 style="background:#002E62; color:#C8C9CB;"| Exhibition

|-
!colspan=9 style="background:#002E62; color:#C8C9CB;"| Non-conference regular season

|-
!colspan=9 style="background:#002E62; color:#C8C9CB;"| Mountain West regular season

|-
!colspan=9 style="background:#002E62; color:#C8C9CB;"| Mountain West Women's Tournament

See also
 2015–16 Nevada Wolf Pack men's basketball team

References

Nevada
Nevada Wolf Pack women's basketball seasons
Nevada Wolf Pack
Nevada Wolf Pack